Selfishness is being concerned excessively or exclusively, for oneself or one's own advantage, pleasure, or welfare, regardless of others.

Selfishness is the opposite of altruism or selflessness; and has also been contrasted (as by C. S. Lewis) with self-centeredness.

Divergent views
The implications of selfishness have inspired divergent views within religious, philosophical, psychological, economic, and evolutionary contexts.

Classical
Aristotle joined a perceived majority of his countrymen in condemning those who sought only to profit themselves; but he approved the man of reason who sought to gain for himself the greatest share of that which deserved social praise.

Seneca proposed a cultivation of the self within a wider community—a care for the self which he opposed to mere selfishness in a theme that would later be taken up by Foucault.

Medieval/Renaissance
Selfishness was viewed in the Western Christian tradition as a central vice—as standing at the roots of the seven deadly sins in the form of pride.

Francis Bacon carried forward this tradition when he characterised “Wisdom for a man's self...[a]s the wisdom of rats”.

Modernity and Contemporary
With the emergence of a commercial society, Bernard Mandeville proposed the paradox that social and economic advance depended on private vices—on what he called the sordidness of selfishness.

Adam Smith with the concept of the invisible hand saw the economic system as usefully channelling selfish self-interest to wider ends. John Locke, along with Adam Smith, was a key figure in early classical liberalism: an ideology that trumps notions of individualism and negative liberty. These core themes inevitably relate to the concept of selfishness. Locke, for example, sought for people to exercise "self-government"—the idea that an individual should make his/her own decisions. This inherent right would allow individuals to pursue self-interests, rather than suffer the burdens of any altruistic obligations.  Thus, unlike political ideologies such as socialism, Locke and other classical liberals believe that selfishness is engrained in human nature. Locke arguably opened the door for later thinkers like Ayn Rand to argue for selfishness as a social virtue and the root of social progress. Ayn Rand held that selfishness is a virtue.

Roman Catholic philosopher Jacques Maritain opposed the latter view by way of the Aristotelian argument that framing the fundamental question of politics as a choice between altruism and selfishness is a basic and harmful mistake of modern states. Rather, cooperation ought to be the norm: human beings are by nature social animals, and so individual persons can only find their full good in and through pursuing the good of the community.

Psychology
Lack of empathy has been seen as one of the roots of selfishness, extending as far as the cold manipulation of the psychopath.

The contrast between self-affirmation and selfishness has become a conflictual arena in which the respective claims of individual/community are often played out between parents and children or men and women, for example.

Psychoanalysts favor the development of a genuine sense of self, and may even speak of a healthy selfishness, as opposed to the self-occlusion of what Anna Freud called "emotional surrender".

Criminology
Self-centeredness was marked as a key feature in a phenomenological theory of criminality named "The Criminal Spin" model. Accordingly, in most criminal behaviors there is a heightened state of self-centeredness, that differently manifests itself in different situations and in different forms of criminality.

See also

References

Further reading
 A Theory of Justice (by John Rawls)
 The Evolution of Cooperation, Robert Axelrod, Basic Books, 
 The Selfish Gene, Richard Dawkins (1990), second edition—includes two chapters about the evolution of cooperation, 
The Virtue of Selfishness, Ayn Rand,

External links

 Is Human Nature Fundamentally Selfish or Altruistic?

Narcissism
Individualism
Morality
Philosophy of life